Neil Graham MacFarquhar is an American writer who is a national correspondent for The New York Times.

Early life and education
MacFarquhar grew up in the 1960s in Brega, a fenced-off expatriate oil compound in Libya. MacFarquhar went to elementary school in Libya. He graduated from Deerfield Academy and then Stanford University in international relations in 1982.

Career
After graduation, he returned to the Middle East, became fluent in Arabic, and covered the region for the Associated Press and then as The New York Times bureau chief in Cairo. From June 2008 to the summer of 2013, MacFarquhar was the Timess United Nations bureau chief. From November 2006 to May 2008, he was a national correspondent for the paper, based in San Francisco. He was the Middle East correspondent, based in Cairo, from 2001 until 2006. Later, he was the newspaper's Moscow bureau chief.

MacFarquhar was a member of the team of reporters from The New York Times who won the 2017 Pulitzer Prize for International Reporting for a series of articles examining how Russia under President Vladimir V. Putin spreads its influence abroad.

He is also author of The Sand Cafe, a satirical novel about foreign correspondents mired in a Saudi hotel awaiting the start of the Gulf war and trying to either undermine or seduce each other as the war refuses to get underway. It was partly written during his recuperation from an accident where a runaway bus knocked MacFarquhar off his bicycle on Fifth Avenue in New York City.

MacFarquhar's second book, The Media Relations Department of Hizbollah Wishes You a Happy Birthday: Unexpected Encounters in the Changing Middle East, is a journal of MacFarquhar's experiences in the region, starting with his childhood in Col. Gaddafi's Libya, and an assessment of the prospects for political and social change. The book combines aspects of everyday life with the stories of individual men and women working for a freer Middle East.

Bibliography
 The Sand Café. New York: Public Affairs Books, 2006.  
  The Media Relations Department of Hizbollah Wishes You a Happy Birthday: Unexpected Encounters in the Changing Middle East. New York: Public Affairs Books, 2009.

References

External links
Articles by MacFarquhar in The New York Times
 Neil MacFarquhar, website.
 MacFarquhar discusses "The Sand Cafe",  Authors@Google talks (50 m.), uploaded June 28, 2007.
 "Update on Egypt", Charlie Rose panel with Tarek Masoud, Harvard University, MacFarquhar, and Anthony Shadid, The New York Times; PBS, January 31, 2011 (30 m.).

1960s births
Living people
Stanford University alumni
American male journalists
American war correspondents
The New York Times writers
Place of birth missing (living people)